The 2018 New Mexico House of Representatives elections took place as part of the biennial United States elections. New Mexico voters elected state representatives in all 70 of the state house's districts. State representatives serve two-year terms in the New Mexico House of Representatives.

A primary election on June 5, 2018 determined which candidates appear on the November 6 general election ballot. Primary election results can be obtained from the New Mexico Secretary of State's website.

In the 2016 state House elections, Democrats flipped 5 seats from Republican hands and took control of the House by increasing their seats from 33 to 38. This put Democrats in effective control of the New Mexico House of Representatives.

To claim control of the chamber from Democrats, the Republicans would need to net 4 House seats. However, in the elections, the Democrats made a net gain of 8 seats, increasing their seats from 38 to 46.

Summary of results

Source:

Retiring incumbents
10 incumbent Representatives (7 Republicans, 3 Democrats) chose to not seek reelection.

Sarah Maestas Barnes (R), District 15
Gregg Schmedes (R), District 22
Larry Larrañaga (R), District 27
Nate Gentry (R), District 30
Bill McCamley (D), District 33
Nick L. Salazar (D), District 40
Stephanie Garcia Richard (D), District 43 (Running for Public Lands Commissioner)
Yvette Herrell (R), District 51 (Running for Congress)
Bob Wooley (R), District 66
Dennis Roch (R), District 67

Defeated incumbents

In primary
Bealquin Bill Gomez (D), District 34
Debbie Rodella (D), District 41
Carl Trujillo (D), District 46

In general election
Sharon Clahchischilliage (R), District 4
Jimmie Hall (R), District 28
David Adkins (R), District 29
Ricky Little (R), District 53
Monica Youngblood (R), District 68

Detailed results

Sources:

District 1

District 2

District 3

District 4

District 5

District 6

District 7

District 8

District 9

District 10

District 11

District 12

District 13
Democratic primary

General election

District 14

District 15

District 16

District 17

District 18

District 19

District 20

District 21

District 22
Republican primary

District 23

District 24
Republican primary

District 25

District 26

District 27
Democratic primary

General election

District 28

District 29

District 30

District 31
Republican primary

General election

District 32

District 33
Democratic primary

General election

District 34
Democratic primary

General election

District 35

District 36

District 37

District 38

District 39

District 40
Democratic primary

General election

District 41
Democratic primary

District 42

District 43
Democratic primary

General election

District 44

District 45

District 46
Democratic primary

General election

District 47

District 48

District 49

District 50

District 51

District 52
Democratic primary

General election

District 53
Democratic primary

General election

District 54

District 55

District 56

District 57

District 58

District 59

District 60

District 61

District 62

District 63

District 64

District 65

District 66

District 67

District 68

District 69

District 70

See also
 United States elections, 2018
 United States Senate election in New Mexico, 2018
 United States House of Representatives elections in New Mexico, 2018
 New Mexico elections, 2018
 New Mexico gubernatorial election, 2018
 Elections in New Mexico

Notes

References

House
New Mexico House of Representatives elections
New Mexico House of Representatives